Marius Ene (born 2 October 1972) is a Romanian biathlete. He competed in the men's 20 km individual event at the 1998 Winter Olympics.

References

External links
 

1972 births
Living people
Romanian male biathletes
Olympic biathletes of Romania
Biathletes at the 1998 Winter Olympics
People from Sinaia